Sir Robert Anderson, 1st Baronet (8 December 1837 – 16 July 1921), was an Irish businessman, High Sheriff and Lord Mayor of Belfast.

He was the son of James Anderson, of Corbofin, County Monaghan, and moved to Belfast at the age of fifteen.

In 1861, in conjunction with the John B. McAuley, he founded and remained proprietor of the firm of Anderson and McAuley, a now defunct Belfast department store. He was also a director of several other companies.

Dod's Peerage, Baronetage and Knightage, Etc. of Great Britain and Ireland for 1915, page 53.

Chairman of Anderson & McAuley, Ltd. ; Sir John Arnott & Co., Ltd. ; Vulcanite, Ltd. ; City Estates, Ltd. ; Milfort Weaving and Finishing Co., Ltd. ; William Ross & Co., Ltd., spinners. ; Baltic Firewood Co., Ltd. ; a director of Laganvale Brick Works.

Vulcanite Ltd. was acquired by Ruberoid Co in 1971, now part of the IKO group.

He was a J.P. for County Antrim, appointed High Sheriff of Belfast in 1903 and knighted the same year during a visit by King Edward VII.  He became a Conservative Member of the Corporation of Belfast from 1893, and was elected Lord Mayor of Belfast in 1908. In 1911 he was appointed High Sheriff of Monaghan and created a baronet, of Parkmount in the County of the City of Belfast and of Mullaghmore in the County of Monaghan.

In 1890, he had married Wilhelmina, daughter of the Rev. Andrew Long, of Monreagh, Carrigans, County Donegal. They lived at Parkmount, Greencastle, County Antrim (which he had purchased from the McNeills), and at Mullaghmore House, County Monaghan. He died in 1921 and was buried in Belfast City Cemetery. On his death without an heir the baronetage became extinct.

Arms

References

	

1837 births
1921 deaths
High Sheriffs of Belfast
High Sheriffs of Monaghan
Lord Mayors of Belfast
Baronets in the Baronetage of the United Kingdom
19th-century Irish businesspeople
20th-century Irish businesspeople
Burials at Belfast City Cemetery